5·12 Wenchuan Earthquake Memorial Museum (5.12汶川特大地震纪念馆) is a Memorial museum located in Beichuan County, Sichuan, China, to commemorate victims of the 2008 Sichuan earthquake.

Components 

The museum is composed of three parts:
 Museum and service area: The museum and service area is located in the site of the old Beichuan High School. To the south of the museum is the service area.
 Ruins of the old Beichuan county seat: The old Beichuan county seat was located in Qushan Town (曲山镇). After the earthquake, the county seat was moved to Yongchang Town (永昌镇), which belonged to the An county before the earthquake. The old Beichuan county seat was abandoned, and the ruins were preserved. There were hydraulic engineering projects to help preserve the site. The old county seat has been formally opened to the public since October 1, 2011.
 Tangjiashan Lake: Tangjiashan Lake is a landslide-dammed lake formed in the earthquake.

References 

 "北川国家地震遗址博物馆" . Phoenix News. March 31, 2009.
 "老北川地震遗址今起全面对外开放" . Phoenix Sichuan. October 2, 2009. Archived from the original on April 25, 2012.

Museums in Sichuan
2008 Sichuan earthquake
History museums in China
Earthquake museums